The 1980 Hardie-Ferodo 1000 was the 21st running of the Bathurst 1000 touring car race. It was held on 5 October 1980 at the Mount Panorama Circuit just outside Bathurst in New South Wales, Australia. The race was open to cars eligible under the locally developed CAMS Group C Touring Car regulations with four engine capacity based classes.

Peter Brock and Jim Richards won their third consecutive Bathurst 1000 debuting the Holden Commodore for the Holden Dealer Team. In taking a one lap win over Peter Janson and Larry Perkins, Brock won his fifth Bathurst 1000, breaking the record for most wins in the history of the race. Janson and Perkins finished second for the second successive year and finished three laps ahead of Ian Geoghegan and Paul Gulson as Commodores filled the first seven positions.

The race is most famous for the retirement of the Ford Falcon of Dick Johnson. The 1980 Australian Touring Car Championship had featured one of the smallest fields in its then twelve years as a multi-race championship. The championship was dominated by Brock, with only two or three other cars competitive, including the Chevrolet Camaro Z28 of Kevin Bartlett. The emergence of hard charging Ford privateer Johnson into a race winning threat just one month prior to Bathurst revitalised interest, more so when Johnson qualified on the front row of the grid, alongside the pole-setting Camaro of Bartlett, and ahead of Brock. Johnson ran away from the field at the start and Brock dropped a lap behind Johnson after a clash with a back-marker Holden Gemini. Johnson crashed heavily into the wall just after the Cutting on lap 17 after clipping a large rock on the track when presented with no other options as a slow-moving tow truck carrying a dead-car blocked the other side of the track. During a Channel 7 television interview with visiting pit reporter Chris Economaki, a distraught Johnson stated he had dedicated all of his finances in a final shot at the winning the race after ten years as a competent mid-fielder. Mike Raymond then interrupted the interview from the commentary booth to inform a moved Johnson that their switchboards around the country were flooded with calls from people pledging money to get Johnson and his Ford back racing. Eventually a total of AU$72,000 was raised. This was matched dollar for dollar by the then boss of Ford Australia, Edsel Ford II, who quickly saw the value of having Johnson keeping Ford at the front of touring car racing despite the company having pulled out of racing at the end of 1978. Johnson would go on to repay the faith shown in him by Edsel Ford and the Australian public, using the $144,000 he received to build a new Falcon in which he would go on to win the 1981 ATCC and the crash shortened 1981 James Hardie 1000.

The 1980 win by the HDT Commodore saw Holden become the first manufacturer since Ford in 1963, 1964 and 1965 to win three consecutive races on The Mountain.

Class structure

3001-6000cc

The class featured the V8 Holden Commodores, racing at Bathurst for the first time, the equally new Ford XD Falcons, Chevrolet Camaros and a Jaguar XJ-S.

2001-3000cc
The class featured a battle between Ford Capris and Mazda RX7s, with a six-cylinder Holden Commodore.

1601-2000cc
The class saw a mix Alfa Romeo Alfettas, Ford Escorts, Toyota Celicas and Triumph Dolomites plus a single Isuzu Gemini.

Up to 1600cc
The final class featured Ford Escorts, Holden Geminis, Isuzu Geminis, a Toyota Corolla, an Alfa Romeo Alfasud, a Volkswagen Golf GTi and a Mitsubishi Lancer.

Hardies Heroes

* This was the first touring car race in which he competed during 1980 where Peter Brock's #05 HDT Commodore did not claim pole position. Brock had claimed pole in his previous 12 races during the year including all 8 rounds of the ATCC and the Hang Ten 400 at Sandown.* It was the first time that the 5.7L V8 Chevrolet Camaro, an American car, had sat on pole for the race. The Camaro was also the first non-Holden or Ford to compete in Hardie's Heroes since its inception in 1978. The pair would repeat this in 1981.

Results

Statistics
 Provisional Pole Position - #9 Kevin Bartlett
 Pole Position - #9 Kevin Bartlett - 2:20.972
 Fastest Lap - #17 Dick Johnson - 2:22.2
 Average Speed - 148 km/h
 Race Time - 6:47:52.7

Further reading
 Australia's Greatest Motor Race, 1960–1989, page 310

References

External links
 CAMS Manual reference to Australian titles
 www.touringcarracing.net
 race results
 Autopics Bathurst images
 Entry List from the Official Programme for the 1980 Hardie Ferodo 1000, pages 44 & 45 Retrieved from www.uniquecarsandparts.com.au on 6 February 2009
 Official Results for the 1980 Hardie Ferodo 1000 from the Official Programme for the 1981 James Hardie 1000, page 73 Retrieved from www.uniquecarsandparts.com.au on 6 February 2009

Motorsport in Bathurst, New South Wales
Hardie-Ferodo 1000